Eugene Black (July 2, 1879 – May 22, 1975) was an American lawyer, teacher, and grocer who was the Democratic United States Representative from the First District of Texas from 1915 to 1929. In 1929 he was appointed by President Hoover to serve on the United States Board of Tax Appeals, on which he served until 1966.

Born near Blossom, Lamar County, Texas, Black attended Blossom's public schools and taught school in Lamar county from 1898 to 1900. Black was employed in the Blossom post office, and graduated from Cumberland School of Law in 1905. He was admitted to the bar the same year and commenced practice in Clarksville, Texas. He was also engaged in the wholesale grocery business. Black was elected as a Democrat to the 64th United States Congress and to the six succeeding congresses.

Black was an unsuccessful candidate for renomination in 1928, but was appointed by President Herbert Hoover to the United States Board of Tax Appeals on November 5, 1929, and served until March 31, 1966. Black resided in Washington, D.C., until his death there on May 22, 1975. He was interred in Cedar Hill Cemetery, Suitland, Maryland.

External links

1879 births
1975 deaths
People from Lamar County, Texas
Judges of the United States Tax Court
United States Article I federal judges appointed by Herbert Hoover
20th-century American judges
Democratic Party members of the United States House of Representatives from Texas
People from Clarksville, Texas
Members of the United States Board of Tax Appeals
Cumberland School of Law alumni